Joan Erbe Udel (1926 – August 21, 2014) was a Baltimore painter and sculptor.  She was best known for using bright colors and was called "The Grand Duchess of Baltimore Painters" by Ned Oldham as quoted by Rebecca Hoffberger in Baltimore Magazine.  She received her training at the Maryland Institute College of Art, where she was a student of Leonard Bahr and Louis Bouché.

Early life
Joan Erbe was born in Baltimore in 1926. She was the daughter of Harry Erbe, a wholesale coffee salesman and Bertha Metcalf Erbe, who was a secretary at the Enoch Pratt Free Library's children's department.

Career
Erbe received two scholarships to Maryland Institute in her early 20s. She had her first solo exhibit at the Baltimore Museum of Art in 1966. Additional solo exhibitions are list below.

Personal life and death
Erbe married at 18 years of age and had two daughters, Joan and Constance. She had another child, Jacob, with her second husband George Udel, whom she married in 1954.
 
Erbe died on August 21, 2014 at the age of 87.

Exhibitions

Erbe's work has been the subject of more than sixty solo exhibitions including at:

 The Baltimore Museum of Art
 The Butler Institute of American Art
 Goucher College
 Johns Hopkins University
 The Smithsonian Institution (Washington, D.C.)
 Philadelphia Art Alliance
 Salpeter Gallery (New York City)
 St. John's College (Annapolis, MD)
 The Art Gallery at the University of Maryland
 I.F. A. Gallery (Washington, DC)

References

External links
Maryland ArtSource

1926 births
2014 deaths
American contemporary painters
Artists from Baltimore
Maryland Institute College of Art alumni
20th-century American painters
21st-century American painters
20th-century American sculptors
20th-century American women artists
21st-century American women artists
American women painters
Sculptors from Maryland